Oneto is a surname. Notable people with the surname include:

Bettina Oneto (born 1957), Peruvian actress and comedian
Carlos Oneto (1929–2014), Peruvian actor, television personality and comedian, father of Bettina
Luca Oneto (born 1996), Italian footballer
Marco Oneto (born 1982), Chilean handball player
Pepe Oneto (1942–2019), Spanish journalist
Tomás Oneto (born 1998), Argentine footballer
Vanina Oneto (born 1973), Argentine field hockey player